Wendy Cornejo (born 7 January 1993) is a female racewalker from Bolivia. She competed in the Women's 20 kilometres walk event at the 2015 World Championships in Athletics in Beijing, China.

See also
 Bolivia at the 2015 World Championships in Athletics

References

External links 

1993 births
Living people
Place of birth missing (living people)
Bolivian female racewalkers
Athletes (track and field) at the 2015 Pan American Games
Pan American Games competitors for Bolivia
World Athletics Championships athletes for Bolivia
Athletes (track and field) at the 2016 Summer Olympics
Olympic athletes of Bolivia